Chinuri (also known as Kaspuri and Kaspuri White) is a white wine grape variety of  high acidity. It is associated with Georgian wine, and is grown in Kartli, reaching full maturity by late October. Chinuri is commonly used for both still and sparkling wines by blending with Goruli Mtsvane and Aligote.
It exhibits good resistance to fungal diseases and phylloxera.

Etymology
"Chinuri" is derived from  chinebuli, meaning "excellent" in Georgian language.

See also 
Georgian wine
List of Georgian wine appellations

References 

Georgian wine
White wine grape varieties